Hawstead is a small village and civil parish in the West Suffolk district of Suffolk in eastern England.

The place-name 'Hawstead' is first attested in the Domesday Book of 1086, where it appears as Haldsteada. The name is thought to mean 'a place of shelter for cattle'.

Hawstead Place, previously the seat of the Drury family, is now a farmhouse. Sir William Drury was sheriff and knight of the shire for Suffolk. Lt Col Edward Robert Drury, son of Rev Sir William Drury,  was the first General Manager and President of the Queensland Bank of Australia now the National Australia Bank; he named his Queensland home 'Hawstead' in 1875.

Lady Drury's Closet (also known as the Hawstead Panels), now in Christchurch Mansion in Ipswich, is a series of painted wooden panels of early 17th-century date. They originally decorated a painted closet adjacent to a bedroom in Hawstead Place. It is believed they were made for Anne Drury, Lady Drury, wife of Sir Robert Drury, who died in 1624.

Demography
According to the Office for National Statistics, at the time of the United Kingdom Census 2001, Hawstead had a population of 334 with 121 households. falling to a population of 134 in 56 households at the 2011 Census.

Population change

Location grid

References

External links
1841-1911 Census Returns for Hawstead

 
Villages in Suffolk
Civil parishes in Suffolk
Borough of St Edmundsbury